Beyond Therapy is a 1987 American comedy film written and directed by Robert Altman, based on the 1981 play of the same name by Christopher Durang. It stars Julie Hagerty, Jeff Goldblum, Glenda Jackson, Tom Conti, and Christopher Guest.

Plot
Two Manhattanites, Prudence and Bruce, are seeking stable romantic relationships with the help of their respective psychiatrists, lecherous Stuart and scatterbrained Charlotte, each of whom suggests the patient place a personal ad. Their first meeting proves to be a disaster, but when they reunite sparks begin to fly. Complications ensue when bisexual Bruce's jealous live-in lover Bob decides to assert himself and do everything possible to maintain his status quo.

Cast
 Julie Hagerty as Prudence
 Jeff Goldblum as Bruce
 Glenda Jackson as Charlotte
 Tom Conti as Stuart
 Christopher Guest as Bob
 Geneviève Page as Zizi
 Cris Campion as Andrew
 Sandrine Dumas as Cindy
 Bertrand Bonvoisin as Le Gérant
 Nicole Evans as The Cashier
 Louis-Marie Taillefer as Le Chef
 Matthew Leonard-Lesniak as Mr. Bean
 Laure Killing as Charlie

Production
According to Durang, both he and Altman wrote separate screenplays. Ultimately, Durang's script was rewritten substantially by Altman with Durang later describing the project as "a very unhappy experience and outcome."

Despite its New York City setting, the film was made in Paris, where director Robert Altman was living at the time.

Reception
Siskel & Ebert gave the film "two thumbs down" on their TV program. Ebert, in his print review, gave it one star out of four and called it a film "killed by terminal whimsy. It's a movie in which every scene must have seemed like a lot of fun at the time, but, when they're edited together, there's no pattern to the movie, nothing to build toward, no reason for us to care. It's all behavior." Vincent Canby of The New York Times wrote that the film lacked "the kind of inexorable logic that is the fuel of any farce and makes its loony characters so funny ... The performances are good, but the film has been assembled without an overriding sense of humor and style. It remains in bits and pieces." Frank Rizzo of Variety called it "a mediocre film version of Christopher Durang's mediocre play. The difference is that this comedy somehow won a good measure of popular success onstage, whereas the screen version is headed nowhere." Dave Kehr of the Chicago Tribune gave the film one star out of four and wrote, "When Altman goes wrong, he usually goes spectacularly wrong—as in 'Quintet' and 'Health'—but this time he has just gone glumly, crushingly wrong. 'Beyond Therapy' never builds up any genuine energy, direction or swing: It just huffs and puffs and eventually hyperventilates." Sheila Benson of the Los Angeles Times was positive, praising "three great comic performances" from "the juiciest cast imaginable." Tom Milne of The Monthly Film Bulletin wrote, "Beyond Therapy is a scattershot film, even more so than usual with Altman, offering a firework display of one-liners and their visual equivalents, some brilliantly funny, some less successful."

On Rotten Tomatoes the film has an approval rating of 17% based on reviews from 12 critics.

References

External links
 
 
 

1987 comedy films
1987 LGBT-related films
1987 films
American comedy films
American LGBT-related films
1980s English-language films
American films based on plays
Films directed by Robert Altman
Films set in New York City
American independent films
New World Pictures films
Films scored by Gabriel Yared
Male bisexuality in film
1987 independent films
Films produced by Steven Haft
LGBT-related comedy films
1980s American films